Edward B. Garvey (born November 13, 1914 in Farmington, Minnesota; died September 20, 1999 at Arlington Hospital in Virginia of congestive heart failure) thru-hiked the Appalachian Trail in 1970 and in 1971 published a book about his adventure, Appalachian Hiker, that raised awareness of thru-hiking.

Garvey was an auditor for the Soil Conservation Service and chief financial officer for the National Science Foundation and retired in 1969.  He lived in the Washington D.C. area from the 1940s.

He helped build and maintain the Appalachian Trail and served as a president of the Potomac Appalachian Trail Club as well as on the Appalachian Trail Conference board of managers and was a member of the Appalachian Long Distance Hikers Association.

He also worked to pass state and federal legislation including the National Trails System Act of 1968 and its 1978 amendments.

In 1996, the Wilderness Society and the Izaak Walton League honored him with the American Land Hero Award for his efforts to protect the Appalachian Trail.

On June 17, 2011 he was inducted into the Appalachian Trail Hall of Fame at the Appalachian Trail Museum as a charter member.

The Ed Garvey Memorial Shelter on the Appalachian Trail at Weverton Cliffs at Weverton, Maryland near Harpers Ferry, West Virginia was built and named in his honor.

See also
Citadel spread

Bibliography
Appalachian Hiker: Adventure of a Lifetime - 1971
Hiking Trails in the Mid-Atlantic States - 1976
The New Appalachian Trail (Appalachian Hiker) - 1997

References

1914 births
1999 deaths
Hikers
Appalachian Trail
American chief financial officers
20th-century American non-fiction writers
People from Farmington, Minnesota